Harutyun Merdinyan (born August 16, 1984) is an Armenian male artistic gymnast and a member of the national team.  He participated at the 2015 World Artistic Gymnastics Championships in Glasgow, and qualified for the 2016 Summer Olympics.

References

External links 
 

1984 births
Living people
Sportspeople from Yerevan
Armenian male artistic gymnasts
Olympic gymnasts of Armenia
Gymnasts at the 2016 Summer Olympics
Medalists at the World Artistic Gymnastics Championships
European champions in gymnastics